Rick Leach (born December 28, 1964) is a former professional tennis player and a coach from the United States. A doubles specialist, he won five Grand Slam doubles titles (three at the Australian Open, one at Wimbledon, and one at the US Open), and four mixed doubles titles (two at the Australian Open, one at Wimbledon, and one at the US Open). He reached the world No. 1 doubles ranking in 1990.

Leach was a member of the US team which won the Davis Cup in 1990. Partnering Jim Pugh, he won the doubles rubbers in all four of the rounds which the US played in that year, and clinched the team's victory in the final with a win over Pat Cash and John Fitzgerald of Australia.

Prior to turning professional, Leach became the first four-time Division 1 All-American in singles and doubles at the University of Southern California (where he played for his father Dick), and won the NCAA doubles title in 1986 and 1987.
He is currently the coach of the OC Breakers.
His brother, Jon Leach, is married to tennis player Lindsay Davenport.



Grand Slam  finals

Doubles (5 titles, 7 runner-ups)

Mixed doubles (4 titles, 5 runner-ups)

Career finals

Doubles (46 wins, 36 losses)

Doubles performance timeline

References

External links
 
 
 

1964 births
Living people
People from Arcadia, California
American male tennis players
Australian Open (tennis) champions
People from Laguna Beach, California
Tennis people from California
US Open (tennis) champions
USC Trojans men's tennis players
Wimbledon champions
Grand Slam (tennis) champions in mixed doubles
Grand Slam (tennis) champions in men's doubles
Universiade medalists in tennis
Universiade silver medalists for the United States
Medalists at the 1985 Summer Universiade
ATP number 1 ranked doubles tennis players